Sixto Betancourt (born 16 May 1992) is a Guatemalan professional footballer who plays as a left-back for Liga Nacional club Santa Lucía.

Club career
Betancourt made his professional debut with Juventud Retalteca on 5 February 2012 against Suchitepéquez in a 3–1 away loss.
 
In August 2014, he was sent on loan to Costa Rican side C.S. Cartaginés.

In February 2015, he was sent again on loan but now to Uruguayan club Plaza Colonia.

Betancourt played a key role during his time at Malacateco as he captained his team to their first Liga Nacional title during the Apertura 2021 season.

International career
Betancourt has played for Guatemala at various youth levels, appearing first for the U17 team at the 2009 CONCACAF U-17 Championship. He also played with the U20 team at the 2011 CONCACAF U-20 Championship helping his country to qualify for the first time to the U-20 World Cup, where he played too.

He made his debut for the senior squad on 22 January 2021 in a friendly game against Puerto Rico, he played the full game.

Honours
Antigua
Liga Nacional de Guatemala: Apertura 2017

Malacateco 
Liga Nacional de Guatemala: Apertura 2021

References

External links

1992 births
Living people
People from Escuintla Department
Guatemalan footballers
Guatemala international footballers
Guatemalan expatriate footballers
Association football defenders
C.D. Suchitepéquez players
C.D. Malacateco players
C.S.D. Municipal players
C.S. Cartaginés players
Plaza Colonia players
Expatriate footballers in Costa Rica
Expatriate footballers in Uruguay